Phascolarctid gammaherpesvirus 1 (PhaHV-1) is a species of virus in the genus Manticavirus, subfamily Gammaherpesvirinae, family Herpesviridae, and order Herpesvirales.

Host

It is hosted by the koala (Phascolarctos cinereus).

References 

Gammaherpesvirinae